Baba Shah Inayat Qadiri Shatari (also called Enayat Shah (1643–1728) was a Sufi scholar and saint of the Qadiri-Shatari silsila (lineage). Shah Inayat Qadiri is famous as the spiritual guide of the universal Punjabi poets Bulleh Shah and Waris Shah.

Name
Baba is an honorific term used as a sign of respect to Sufi saints. It is a term similar to "father" or "wise old man". Shah is another honorific referring to a king. Inayat is an Islamic male first name. Qadiri is an Islamic surname. Shatari or Shattari refers to a tariqah, a Sufi mystical order.

Background 
Shah Inayat was born in an Arain house, his ancestry is with the Arabic tribes of Damascus who arrived in the Indian subcontinent with Muhammad Bin Qasim.” 

Shah Inayat was a Sufi scholar of the Qadiri-Shatari silsila (lineage). All Qadiri Sufi orders trace their lineage to Abdul-Qadir Gilani (1077 CE - 1166 CE). Shah Inayat was the son of Mawlawi Pir Mohammad of Kasur, who was an Imam.

Work
Shah Inayat is remembered as a preacher, a religious scholar, a philosopher and a saint. Shah Inayat was a scholar of mysticism. He wrote mostly in Persian. His works include:
 Dasturul Amal
 Islahul Amal
 Lataif-e-Ghaibya, and 
 Ishartul Taliban

See also
 List of Sufi saints

References

External links
 Dastur ul Amal on Google Books.
 Chopra R. M. (1999) Great Sufi Poets of the Punjab, Iran Society, Calcutta.

1643 births
1728 deaths
Mughal Empire Sufis
People from Kasur District
Punjabi people
Punjabi Sufi saints